Acacia aciphylla is a shrub belonging to the genus Acacia and the subgenus Juliflorae. It is native to the Mid West region of Western Australia.

Description
It has glabrous branchlets and phyllodes. The sessile phyllodes are decurrent on branchlets. They are rigid, erect, straight and terete to slightly rhombic in cross-section. It flowers from July to September producing densely packed golden-yellow flowers. The inflorescences are simple with two found 2 per axil.

Classification
The species was first formally described by the botanist George Bentham in 1855 in the work  Plantae Muellerianae: Mimoseae as published in the work Linnaea: ein Journal für die Botanik in ihrem ganzen Umfange, oder Beiträge zur Pflanzenkunde. Synonyms for the species include Racosperma aciphyllum.

Two varieties are recognized :
Acacia aciphylla var. aciphylla
Acacia aciphylla var. leptostachys

Distribution
The plant will grown in sandy, loamy and lateritic soils and on granite outcrops and rocky ridges in mixed shrub-land communities. It has a broken distribution between Kalbarri, Mullewa and Morawa.

See also
 List of Acacia species

References

External links
Flora of Australia: Acacia aciphylla Benth.

aciphylla
Plants described in 1855
Acacias of Western Australia
Taxa named by George Bentham